is a passenger railway station in located in the city of Iga,  Mie Prefecture, Japan, operated by the private railway operator Iga Railway.

Lines
Hirokōji Station is served by the Iga Line, and is located 4.4 rail kilometers from the starting point of the line at Iga-Ueno Station.

Station layout
The station consists of a single side platform serving bidirectional traffic. The station is unattended and has no station building. The platform is short and can only handle trains of two cars in length.

Platform

Adjacent stations

History
Hirokōji Station was opened on July 18, 1922. Through a series of mergers, the Iga Line became part of the Kintetsu network by June 1, 1944, but was spun out as an independent company in October 2007. The station was closed on June 1, 1945 but was reopened on March 15, 1946. The station has been unattended since March 15, 2000 and the station building was removed on August 27, 2007.

Passenger statistics
In fiscal 2019, the station was used by an average of 47 passengers daily (boarding passengers only).

Surrounding area
Iga Kaido
Matsuo Basho House
Sugawara Shrine
Igashi Ueno Library

See also
List of railway stations in Japan

References

External links

  

Railway stations in Japan opened in 1922
Railway stations in Mie Prefecture
Iga, Mie